Hoppenstedt may refer to:

Places in Germany
 Hoppenstedt (Osterwieck), a village in Harz district, Saxony-Anhalt
 Hoppenstedt, in Lower Saxony, abandoned when the Bergen-Hohne Training Area was established in the 1930s

People with the surname
 Hendrik Hoppenstedt (born 1972), German politician
 Karsten Friedrich Hoppenstedt (born 1937), German politician

Other uses
 Mr & Mrs Hoppenstedt are fictional characters in the comic works of Loriot, such as Jodeldiplom

See also
 
 Hoppenstätt